Wahls is a surname. Notable people with the surname include:

Jessica Wahls (born 1977), German pop singer, songwriter, and television host
Matthias Wahls (born 1968), German chess grandmaster and poker player
Terry Wahls (born 1955), American physician
Zach Wahls (born 1991), American politician, activist, and author

See also
Wahl (surname)